Timothy Ryan Parker (born February 23, 1993) is an American professional soccer player who plays as a center-back for Major League Soccer club St. Louis City.

Early career
Parker played his high school soccer at Hicksville High School, serving as team captain for his final 2 seasons.  During his senior season, Parker scored 25 goals and had 8 assists, earning him numerous accolades, including being named the 2010–11 Gatorade New York Boys Soccer Player of the Year.

He played four seasons of college soccer at St. John's University. He made a total of 79 appearances for the Red Storm and tallied four goals and four assists.  He helped St. John's win the 2011 Big East Conference Men's Soccer Tournament and qualify for the NCAA Tournament from 2011 to 2013.  He captained the Red Storm for his senior season.  He made the 2011 Big East All-Freshman team, 2012 All-Big East 2nd team , and the 2013 and 2014 All-Big East 1st teams.  Parker also made the 2012 and 2013 NSCAA All-Region 1st team and the 2014 NSCAA All-Region 3rd team.

While at St. John's, he also played in the Premier Development League for the Long Island Rough Riders and appeared for the Brooklyn Italians in the National Premier Soccer League in 2013.

Professional career

Vancouver Whitecaps 
On January 15, 2015, Parker was selected 13th overall in the 2015 MLS SuperDraft by the Vancouver Whitecaps.  On March 30, he made his professional debut for Vancouver's USL affiliate club Whitecaps FC 2 in a 4–0 defeat to Seattle Sounders FC 2. Parker made his debut for the Whitecaps first team, as well as MLS debut, on May 2, coming on as a late substitute in a 0–0 draw with Cascadia Cup rivals Portland Timbers.  He made his first start for the Whitecaps in their next match, a 3–0 win against the Philadelphia Union.  On August 5, he scored in his CONCACAF Champions League debut against Cascadia Cup rivals the Seattle Sounders. Parker made 4 appearances and scored 1 goal during the CCL group stage as the Whitecaps finished last in their group.  In Canadian Championship play, Parker started all 4 of Vancouver's matches.  On August 26, he scored in the second leg of the final against the Montreal Impact, helping Vancouver win their first championship 4–2 on aggregate.  He made 15 appearances in MLS regular season play, helping the Whitecaps finish 2nd in the Western Conference and qualify for the playoffs.  Parker was part of a Vancouver defense that allowed 36 goals during the season, tied for the fewest in the league.  Vancouver's first opponent in the playoffs was Portland, and despite Parker playing every minute of both legs, the Whitecaps would lose 2–0 on aggregate to the eventual MLS Cup champion Timbers.

Parker and Vancouver opened the 2016 season on March 6 with a 3–2 loss to the Impact. On June 29, 2016, Parker scored in his second straight Canadian Championship final, giving the Whitecaps a 2–0 lead in the match and 2–1 aggregate lead. Vancouver gave up a goal in 5 minutes into stoppage time to Will Johnson, leveling the aggregate score at 2–2 and giving Toronto FC the win on away goals. Parker ended the 2016 MLS season with 29 appearances.  However, it was a poor season for the Whitecaps, finishing 8th in the conference and missing out on the playoffs.  In Champions League play, Parker made 3 appearances in the group stage, helping Vancouver finish top of their group.

The first match of the 2017 season for the Whitecaps came on February 22 in the Champions League knockout stage, a 1–1 draw with the New York Red Bulls in leg 1 of the quarterfinals.  Parker played in all 4 of Vancouver's CCL games in 2017, helping the Whitecaps reach the semifinals, where they lost to Tigres 4–1 on aggregate.  Vancouver and Parker opened the 2017 MLS season on March 5 with a 0–0 draw against Philadelphia.  On May 20, he scored his first career MLS goal in a 2–0 victory against Sporting Kansas City.  Parker ended the regular season with 32 appearances, 1 goal and 1 assist, helping the Whitecaps finish 3rd in the Western Conference and qualify for the playoffs.  In the first round of the playoffs, Parker had an assist as Vancouver defeated the San Jose Earthquakes 5–0.  He started both legs of the conference semifinals, a 2–0 aggregate loss to the Seattle Sounders.

New York Red Bulls 
On March 2, 2018, Parker was traded to the New York Red Bulls in exchange for Felipe, $500,000 in targeted allocation money (TAM), and a 2018 international roster slot. On March 6, 2018 he made his Red Bulls debut, appearing as a starter in a 2–0 victory in Mexico over Club Tijuana in the CONCACAF Champions League.  He made 4 CCL appearances during 2018, helping New York reach the semifinals, where they lost to eventual champions Guadalajara 1–0 on aggregate.  He played his first MLS game with the Red Bulls on March 17, a 1–0 loss to Real Salt Lake.  On September 30, 2018, Parker scored his first goal for New York in a 2–0 victory over Atlanta United.  He ended his first season with the Red Bulls with 1 goal and 2 assists in 29 MLS regular season appearances.  Parker partnered with fellow center-back Aaron Long to anchor the best defense in MLS, allowing a league low 33 goals and keeping a league leading 15 clean sheets.  Parker helped the Red Bulls win the Supporters' Shield with a then record 71 points. Parker played every minute of the playoffs as the Red Bulls reached the conference finals, where they lost 3–1 on aggregate to eventual MLS Cup champions Atlanta United, with Parker scoring New York's goal.  Following the 2018 season, Parker signed a new contract with the Red Bulls.
Parker and the Red Bulls opened the 2019 season on February 20 with a 2–0 win over Atlético Pantoja in the CONCACAF Champions League.  Parker made 4 appearances in the Champions League as New York reached the quarterfinals, where they lost to Santos Laguna with an aggregate score of 6–2.  He made 31 MLS regular season appearances in 2019, helping the Red Bulls finish 6th in the Eastern Conference and qualify for the playoffs.  On October 20, scored in the Red Bulls opening game of the playoffs, however, New York would lose 4–3 to the Philadelphia Union in extra time.

On October 28, 2020, Parker got an assist in the 89th minute to give the Red Bulls a 1–0 win over the New England Revolution, heading a corner kick onto Aaron long, who put the ball into the net.  In a shortened season due to the COVID-19 pandemic, Parker ended the regular season with 1 assist from 19 appearances (out of a possible 23), helping New York finish 6th in the Eastern Conference and qualify for the playoffs.  In the Red Bulls' first playoff game, Parker played the full 90 minutes, but New York lost to eventual MLS Cup champions Columbus Crew 3–2.

Houston Dynamo
On January 19, 2021, Parker was traded to the Houston Dynamo in exchange for $450,000 of General Allocation Money, and a further $600,000 in performance-based incentives. He made his Dynamo debut on April 16, playing the full 90 minutes in a 2–1 win over the San Jose Earthquakes.  On June 23 Parker signed a contract extension with Houston until 2024.  Parker played every minute of the season for Houston, making 34 appearances, however the team did not enjoy a successful campaign, finishing last in the Western Conference and failing to qualify for the playoffs.  Parker was named co-captain before the season, but actually wore the captain's armband for most of the season due to veteran Boniek García, the primary captain, only starting 6 games.

Parker made 28 appearances, 26 of them starts, in the 2022 regular season, but Houston missed the playoffs again after finishing 13th in the conference.  He also made an appearance in the Open Cup.

St. Louis City SC 
On November 11, 2022, Parker was traded to St. Louis City SC ahead of their inaugural season for $500,000 of GAM, with Houston paying a portion of his salary. On February 25, 2023, the opening match of the season, Parker scored the first goal in St. Louis' franchise history against Austin FC, as the match eventually ended in a 2–3 victory for his side.

International career
In January 2016, Parker received his first call-up to the senior United States squad for friendlies against Iceland and Canada. He did not appear in either of the two matches. Two years later, he was called up for a friendly against Bosnia and Herzegovina. Parker made his senior team debut against Ireland on June 2, 2018.

Career statistics

Club

International

Honors
Vancouver Whitecaps
Canadian Championship: 2015

New York Red Bulls
MLS Supporters' Shield: 2018

Personal life 
Parker was born and raised in Hicksville, New York to Ken and Kathy Parker.  He has one older brother, Kevin.  He attended Hicksville High School and St. John's University, where he majored in  finance.  Before committing to soccer, Parker also played lacrosse.

References

External links
 St. John's profile
 

1993 births
Living people
American soccer players
Soccer players from New York (state)
Sportspeople from Nassau County, New York
People from Hicksville, New York
Association football central defenders
St. John's Red Storm men's soccer players
Long Island Rough Riders players
Vancouver Whitecaps FC draft picks
Vancouver Whitecaps FC players
Whitecaps FC 2 players
New York Red Bulls players
Houston Dynamo FC players
Brooklyn Italians players
Major League Soccer players
USL Championship players
National Premier Soccer League players
USL League Two players
United States men's international soccer players
United States men's under-23 international soccer players
United States men's youth international soccer players
American expatriate soccer players
Expatriate soccer players in Canada
American expatriate sportspeople in Canada